The mole (symbol mol) is the unit of amount of substance in the International System of Units (SI). The quantity amount of substance is a measure of how many elementary entities of a given substance are in an object or sample. The mole is defined as containing exactly  elementary entities. Depending on what the substance is, an elementary entity may be an atom, a molecule, an ion, an ion pair, or a subatomic particle such as an electron. For example, 10 moles of water (a chemical compound) and 10 moles of mercury (a chemical element), contain equal amounts of substance and the mercury contains exactly one atom for each molecule of the water, despite the two having different volumes and different masses.

The number of elementary entities in one mole is known as the Avogadro number, which is the approximate number of nucleons (protons or neutrons) in one gram of ordinary matter. The previous definition of a mole was the number of elementary entities equal to that of 12 grams of carbon-12, the most common isotope of carbon.
 
The mole is widely used in chemistry as a convenient way to express amounts of reactants and products of chemical reactions. For example, the chemical equation  can be interpreted to mean that for each 2 mol dihydrogen (H2) and 1 mol dioxygen (O2) that react, 2 mol of water (H2O) form. The concentration of a solution is commonly expressed by its molar concentration, defined as the amount of dissolved substance per unit volume of solution, for which the unit typically used is moles per litre (mol/L).

The term gram-molecule was formerly used for "mole of molecules", and gram-atom for "mole of atoms". For example, 1 mole of MgBr2 is 1 gram-molecule of MgBr2 but 3 gram-atoms of MgBr2.

Concepts

Nature of the particles
The mole corresponds to a given count of particles. Usually the particles counted are chemically identical entities, individually distinct. For example, a solution may contain a certain number of dissolved molecules that are more or less independent of each other. However, in a solid the constituent particles are fixed and bound in a lattice arrangement, yet they may be separable without losing their chemical identity. Thus the solid is composed of a certain number of moles of such particles. In yet other cases, such as diamond, where the entire crystal is essentially a single molecule, the mole is still used to express the number of atoms bound together, rather than a count of molecules. Thus, common chemical conventions apply to the definition of the constituent particles of a substance, in other cases exact definitions may be specified.
The mass of a substance is equal to its relative atomic (or molecular) mass multiplied by the molar mass constant, which is almost exactly 1 g/mol.

Molar mass
The molar mass of a substance is the ratio of the mass of a sample of that substance to its amount of substance. The amount of substance is given as the number of moles in the sample. 
For most practical purposes, the numerical value of the molar mass expressed with the unit gram per mole is the same as that of the mean mass of one molecule of the substance expressed with the unit dalton. For example, the molar mass of water is 18.015 g/mol. Other methods include the use of the molar volume or the measurement of electric charge.

The number of moles of a substance in a sample is obtained by dividing the mass of the sample by the molar mass of the compound. For example, 100 g of water is about 5.551 mol of water.

The molar mass of a substance depends not only on its molecular formula, but also on the distribution of isotopes of each chemical element present in it.

Molar concentration
The molar concentration, also called molarity, of a solution of some substance is the number of moles per unit of volume of the final solution. In the SI its standard unit is mol/m3, although more practical units, such as mole per litre (mol/L) are used.

Molar fraction
The molar fraction or mole fraction of a substance in a mixture (such as a solution) is the number of moles of the compound in one sample of the mixture, divided by the total number of moles of all components.

In a mixture of gases, the partial pressure of each component is proportional to its molar ratio.

History

The history of the mole is intertwined with that of molecular mass, atomic mass units, and the Avogadro constant.

The first table of standard atomic weight was published by John Dalton (1766–1844) in 1805, based on a system in which the relative atomic mass of hydrogen was defined as 1. These relative atomic masses were based on the stoichiometric proportions of chemical reaction and compounds, a fact that greatly aided their acceptance: It was not necessary for a chemist to subscribe to atomic theory (an unproven hypothesis at the time) to make practical use of the tables. This would lead to some confusion between atomic masses (promoted by proponents of atomic theory) and equivalent weights (promoted by its opponents and which sometimes differed from relative atomic masses by an integer factor), which would last throughout much of the nineteenth century.

Jöns Jacob Berzelius (1779–1848) was instrumental in the determination of relative atomic masses to ever-increasing accuracy. He was also the first chemist to use oxygen as the standard to which other masses were referred. Oxygen is a useful standard, as, unlike hydrogen, it forms compounds with most other elements, especially metals. However, he chose to fix the atomic mass of oxygen as 100, which did not catch on.

Charles Frédéric Gerhardt (1816–56), Henri Victor Regnault (1810–78) and Stanislao Cannizzaro (1826–1910) expanded on Berzelius' works, resolving many of the problems of unknown stoichiometry of compounds, and the use of atomic masses attracted a large consensus by the time of the Karlsruhe Congress (1860). The convention had reverted to defining the atomic mass of hydrogen as 1, although at the level of precision of measurements at that time – relative uncertainties of around 1% – this was numerically equivalent to the later standard of oxygen = 16. However the chemical convenience of having oxygen as the primary atomic mass standard became ever more evident with advances in analytical chemistry and the need for ever more accurate atomic mass determinations.

The name mole is an 1897 translation of the German unit Mol, coined by the chemist Wilhelm Ostwald in 1894 from the German word Molekül (molecule). The related concept of equivalent mass had been in use at least a century earlier.

Standardization
Developments in mass spectrometry led to the adoption of oxygen-16 as the standard substance, in lieu of natural oxygen.

The oxygen-16 definition was replaced with one based on carbon-12 during the 1960s. The mole was defined by International Bureau of Weights and Measures as "the amount of substance of a system which contains as many elementary entities as there are atoms in 0.012 kilogram of carbon-12." Thus, by that definition, one mole of pure 12C had a mass of exactly 12 g. The four different definitions were equivalent to within 1%.

Because a dalton, a unit commonly used to measure atomic mass, is exactly 1/12 of the mass of a carbon-12 atom, this definition of the mole entailed that the mass of one mole of a compound or element in grams was numerically equal to the average mass of one molecule or atom of the substance in daltons, and that the number of daltons in a gram was equal to the number of elementary entities in a mole. Because the mass of a nucleon (i.e. a proton or neutron) is approximately 1 dalton and the nucleons in an atom's nucleus make up the overwhelming majority of its mass, this definition also entailed that the mass of one mole of a substance was roughly equivalent to the number of nucleons in one atom or molecule of that substance.

Since the definition of the gram was not mathematically tied to that of the dalton, the number of molecules per mole NA (the Avogadro constant) had to be determined experimentally.

The mole was made the seventh SI base unit in 1971 by the 14th CGPM.

2019 redefinition of SI base units
In 2011, the 24th meeting of the General Conference on Weights and Measures (CGPM) agreed to a plan for a possible revision of the SI base unit definitions at an undetermined date.

On 16 November 2018, after a meeting of scientists from more than 60 countries at the CGPM in Versailles, France, all SI base units were defined in terms of physical constants. This meant that each SI unit, including the mole, would not be defined in terms of any physical objects but rather they would be defined by physical constants that are, in their nature, exact.

Such changes officially came into effect on 20 May 2019. Following such changes, "one mole" of a substance was redefined as containing "exactly  elementary entities" of that substance.

Criticism
Since its adoption into the International System of Units in 1971, numerous criticisms of the concept of the mole as a unit like the metre or the second have arisen:
 the number of molecules, etc. in a given amount of material is a fixed dimensionless quantity that can be expressed simply as a number, not requiring a distinct base unit;
 The SI thermodynamic mole is irrelevant to analytical chemistry and could cause avoidable costs to advanced economies
 The mole is not a true metric (i.e. measuring) unit, rather it is a parametric unit, and amount of substance is a parametric base quantity
 the SI defines numbers of entities as quantities of dimension one, and thus ignores the ontological distinction between entities and units of continuous quantities

In chemistry, it has been known since Proust's law of definite proportions (1794) that knowledge of the mass of each of the components in a chemical system is not sufficient to define the system. Amount of substance can be described as mass divided by Proust's "definite proportions", and contains information that is missing from the measurement of mass alone. As demonstrated by Dalton's law of partial pressures (1803), a measurement of mass is not even necessary to measure the amount of substance (although in practice it is usual). There are many physical relationships between amount of substance and other physical quantities, the most notable one being the ideal gas law (where the relationship was first demonstrated in 1857). The term "mole" was first used in a textbook describing these colligative properties.

Similar units
Like chemists, chemical engineers use the unit mole extensively, but different unit multiples may be more suitable for industrial use. For example, the SI unit for volume is the cubic metre, a much larger unit than the commonly used litre in the chemical laboratory. When amount of substance is also expressed in kmol (1000 mol) in industrial-scaled processes, the numerical value of molarity remains the same.

For convenience in avoiding conversions in the imperial (or US customary units), some engineers adopted the pound-mole (notation lb-mol or lbmol), which is defined as the number of entities in 12 lb of 12C.

In the metric system, chemical engineers once used the kilogram-mole (notation kg-mol), which is defined as the number of entities in 12 kg of 12C, and often referred to the mole as the gram-mole (notation g-mol), when dealing with laboratory data.

Late 20th-century chemical engineering practice came to use the kilomole (kmol), which is numerically identical to the kilogram-mole, but whose name and symbol adopt the SI convention for standard multiples of metric units – thus, kmol means 1000 mol. This is equivalent to the use of kg instead of g. The use of kmol is not only for "magnitude convenience" but also makes the equations used for modelling chemical engineering systems coherent. For example, the conversion of a flowrate of kg/s to kmol/s only requires the molecular mass without the factor 1000 unless the basic SI unit of mol/s were to be used.

Greenhouse and growth chamber lighting for plants is sometimes expressed in micromoles per square metre per second, where 1 mol photons =  photons. One mole of photons is sometimes referred to as an einstein.

Derived units and SI multiples
The only SI derived unit with a special name derived from the mole is the katal, defined as one mole per second of catalytic activity. Like other SI units, the mole can also be modified by adding a metric prefix that multiplies it by a power of 10:

One femtomole is exactly 602,214,076 molecules; attomole and smaller quantities cannot be exactly realized. The yoctomole, equal to around 0.6 of an individual molecule, did make appearances in scientific journals in the year the yocto- prefix was officially implemented.

Mole Day
October 23, denoted 10/23 in the US, is recognized by some as Mole Day. It is an informal holiday in honor of the unit among chemists. It starts at 6:02 a.m. and ends at 6:02 p.m. Alternatively, some chemists celebrate June 2, June 22, or 6 February, a reference to the 6.02 or 6.022 part of the constant.

See also

References

External links 
 

SI base units
Units of amount of substance
Units of chemical measurement
Dimensionless numbers of chemistry
Units of amount